Ryszard Mańko (8 April 1946 – 8 February 1994) was a Polish footballer. He played in one match for the Poland national football team in 1970.

References

External links
 

1946 births
1994 deaths
Polish footballers
Poland international footballers
Place of birth missing
Association footballers not categorized by position